The 66th Texas Legislature met from January 9, 1979, to May 28, 1979. All members present during this session were elected in the 1978 general elections.

Sessions
Regular Session: January 9, 1979 - May 28, 1979

Party summary

Senate

House

Officers

Senate
 Lieutenant Governor: William P. Hobby, Jr., Democrat
 President Pro Tempore: Bill Meier, Democrat

House
 Speaker of the House: Bill Wayne Clayton, Democrat

Members

Senate

Dist. 1
 Ed Howard (D), Texarkana

Dist. 2
 Peyton McKnight (D), Tyler

Dist. 3
 Don Adams (D), Jasper

Dist. 4
 Carl A. Parker (D), Port Arthur

Dist. 5
 W. T. "Bill" Moore (D), Bryan

Dist. 6
 Lindon Williams (D), Houston

Dist. 7
 Gene Jones (D), Houston

Dist. 8
 O.H. "Ike" Harris (R), Dallas

Dist. 9
 Ron Clower (D), Garland

Dist. 10
 Bill Meier (D), Euless

Dist. 11
 Chet Brooks (D), Houston

Dist. 12
 Betty Andujar (R), Fort Worth

Dist. 13
 Walter Mengden (R), Waco

Dist. 14
 Lloyd Doggett (D), Austin

Dist. 15
 Jack Ogg (D), Houston

Dist. 16
 Bill Braecklein (D), Dallas

Dist. 17
 A.R. "Babe" Schwartz (D), Galveston

Dist. 18
 W.N. "Bill" Patman (D), Ganado

Dist. 19
 Glenn Kothmann (D), San Antonio

Dist. 20
 Carlos F. Truan (D), Corpus Christi

Dist. 21
 John Traeger (D), Seguin

Dist. 22
 Tom Creighton (D), Mineral Wells

Dist. 23
 Oscar Mauzy (D), Dallas

Dist. 24
 Grant Jones (D), Abilene

Dist. 25
 W. E. "Pete" Snelson (D), Midland

Dist. 26
 R.L. "Bob" Vale (D), San Antonio

Dist. 27
 Raul Longoria (D), Edinburg

Dist. 28
 E L Short (D), Tahoka

Dist. 29
 Tati Santiesteban (D), El Paso

Dist. 30
 Ray Farabee (D), Wichita Falls

Dist. 31
 Bob Price (R), Amarillo

House

External links

66th Texas Legislature
1979 in Texas
1979 U.S. legislative sessions